Sandino is a municipality and town in the Pinar del Río Province of Cuba. The town is located close to the coast and as such, fishing is the main economic resource of this place. It is also the gateway to the Guanahacabibes Peninsula, a UNESCO Biosphere Reserve.

History
The municipality was named after the Nicaraguan revolutionary, Augusto César Sandino. In January 2019 Sacred Heart of Jesus Catholic Church in Sandino became the first Catholic church in Cuba to be inaugurated since the Cuban Revolution.

Geography
Located in the westernmost area of Cuba, the municipality borders with the territories of Guane and Mantua. Its westernmost point is Cape San Antonio (Cabo de San Antonio), on the Guanahacabibes Peninsula.

The municipality includes the hamlets of Babineyes, Bolívar, Cayuco, Cortés, Covadonga, La Bajada, La Conchita, La Fe, La Furnia, La Grifa, Las Martinas, La Yana, Las Tumbas, Los Cayuelos, María la Gorda, Marina Cabo San Antonio, Roncali, San Julián, Santa Barbara, Valle San Juan and Veinte de Mayo.

Demographics
In 2004, the municipality of Sandino had a population of 39,245.

Education

Various high schools (Spanish secundarias) are established in Sandino, with students from San Juan y Martinez, San Luis, all the way to Guane  and Isabel Rubio (approximately an area of about ). Sandino is the newest pole of the Cuban university program ELAM (Escuela Latinoamericana de Medicina) where the Cuban government has placed many similar medical faculties. Many of the students are from Latin America and Caribbean countries such as Guyana, Argentina, Ecuador, Nicaragua, El Salvador, Bolivia, Peru, Suriname, Dominica, St. Lucia, Belize, Jamaica, Haiti, St. Vincent, Antigua, Solomon Islands, Nauru, Grenada, Barbados and more countries to be expected like Tuvalu and the Philippines. They are part of the new education program of the Escuela Latin Americana de Medicina.
There are several campuses located in this municipality. Most only contain people from one country (300 or more students), but there are others such as ELAM 10 that have more than 15 nationalities enrolled. These are however in lesser quantities and have a total of up to 500 students.

Transportation

There are not many roads in this municipality. And even out of this little number, most roads do not have names. The locations are identified by the farms they lead towards. There are regular buses that frequent the town of Sandino, and straight to several locations as Guane, Isabel Rubio and Pinar del Río. It is not uncommon to see oxcarts, donkey-carts and horse-driven carts. Most people have to walk great distances before they can find viable transportation. Hitchhiking is very common in these areas.

In the village of La Fé starts the national road Carretera Central, passing also through Sandino.

Personalities
José Contreras (b. 1971), baseball player

See also

Municipalities of Cuba
List of cities in Cuba
Sandino Municipal Museum
Cabo San Antonio Lighthouse

References

External links

 Sandino on EcuRed
Villa Cabo San Antonio
Villa Maria La Gorda - International Diving Centre

 
Cities in Cuba
Populated places in Pinar del Río Province